Diego Martín López (born 2 November 1981) is an Argentine former professional footballer who played as a midfielder.

Career
Lanús were López's first senior club, with the midfielder appearing nine times for them in the Argentine Primera División between 2000 and 2002. A move to Defensa y Justicia of Primera B Nacional followed, along with six appearances. In 2004, López switched Argentina for Paraguay by agreeing to join Sportivo Luqueño. He scored his first senior league goal for the Paraguayans, it arrived during a 6–1 defeat to Libertad on 24 March. Three years later, Torneo Argentino A side Real Arroyo Seco signed López. Two goals in forty-seven matches occurred, one of which came against 9 de Julio who became his fifth club in August 2009.

After two campaigns in the third tier with 9 de Julio, which brought goals versus Ben Hur, Unión Sunchales, Rivadavia and Juventud Antoniana, López departed to sign for fellow Torneo Argentino A team Santamarina. On 5 July 2012, López moved to Primera B Metropolitana's Flandria. He made his debut in a 4–0 loss at the hands of Temperley on 5 August. Five more appearances followed, prior to López retiring.

Career statistics

References

External links

1981 births
Living people
Sportspeople from Lanús
Argentine footballers
Association football midfielders
Argentine expatriate footballers
Expatriate footballers in Paraguay
Argentine expatriate sportspeople in Paraguay
Argentine Primera División players
Primera Nacional players
Paraguayan Primera División players
Torneo Argentino A players
Primera B Metropolitana players
Club Atlético Lanús footballers
Defensa y Justicia footballers
Sportivo Luqueño players
Real Arroyo Seco footballers
9 de Julio de Rafaela players
Club y Biblioteca Ramón Santamarina footballers
Flandria footballers